In ancient Roman religion, the Compitalia was an annual festival in honor of the Lares Compitales, household deities of the crossroads, to whom sacrifices were offered at the places where two or more ways met.

This festival is more ancient than the building of Rome. It is said by some writers to have been instituted by Tarquinius Priscus in consequence of the miracle attending the birth of Servius Tullius, who was supposed to be the son of a Lar Familiaris, or family guardian deity.

Dionysius says that Servius Tullius founded the festival, which he describes as it was celebrated in his time. Dionysius relates that the sacrifices consisted of honey-cakes presented by the inhabitants of each house; and that the people who assisted as ministering servants at the festival were not free men, but slaves, because the Lares took pleasure in the service of slaves. He further adds that the Compitalia were celebrated a few days after the Saturnalia with great splendor, and that the slaves on this occasion had full liberty to do as they pleased.

During the celebration of the festival, each family placed the statue of the underworld goddess Mania at the door of their house. They also hung up at their doors figures of wool representing men and women, accompanying them with humble requests that the Lares and Mania would be contented with those figures, and spare the people of the house. Slaves offered balls or fleeces of wool instead of human figures.

Macrobius says that the celebration of the Compitalia was restored by the Etruscan king Tarquinius Superbus in response to an oracle that "they should sacrifice heads for heads." The oracle was taken to mean that in order to maintain the health and prosperity of each family, children should be sacrificed to Mania, identified in this case as the mother of the Lares. But Brutus, after overthrowing the line of Tarquin kings, instead satisfied the oracle by exploiting a verbal loophole, substituting "heads" of garlic and poppies.

Public games were added to the festival during the Republican period, but they were suppressed by command of the senate in 68 BCE. Calpurnius Piso was charged by Cicero with violating the decree by allowing the games to be celebrated during his consulship in 58. The festival itself still continued to be observed, even if the games were abolished.

During the civil wars of the 40s, the festival fell into disuse, and was accordingly restored during the program of religious reforms carried out by Augustus. Augustus set up altars to neighbourhood Lares or penates at places where two or more ways met and instituted an order of priests to attend to their worship.

The exact day on which this festival was celebrated appears to have varied, though it was always in the winter, at least in the time of Varro, as observed by Isaac Casaubon. Dionysius again relates that it was celebrated a few days after the Saturnalia, and Cicero that it fell on the Kalends of January; but in one of his letters to Atticus, he speaks of it as occurring on the fourth before the Nones of January (January 2). The exact words with which the festival was announced are preserved by Macrobius and Aulus Gellius:

Suetonius writes that Augustus ordered the Lares Compitales crowned twice yearly with spring and summer flowers ("").

Notes

References
Smith, William, D.C.L., LL.D. "Compitalia". A Dictionary of Greek and Roman Antiquities. John Murray, London, 1875.

"Compital". Oxford English Dictionary. Oxford University Press. 2nd ed. 1989.

Further reading

Ittai Gradel, Emperor Worship and Roman Religion (Oxford University Press, 2002), pp. 117 ff., limited preview online.
Celia E. Schultz, Women's Religious Activity in the Roman Republic (University of North Carolina Press, 2006), pp. 13 ff., limited preview online.
Richard C. Beacham, Spectacle Entertainments of Early Imperial Rome (Yale University Press, 1999), pp. 55ff., limited preview  online.
Ray Laurence, Roman Pompeii: Space and Society (Routledge, 1996), especially pp. 39 ff., limited preview online.
John Bert Lott, The Neighborhoods of Augustan Rome (Cambridge University Press, 2004), especially pp. 37ff., limited preview online.
Tesse Dieder Stek, Sanctuary and Society in Central-Southern Italy (Ipskamp PrintPartners, 2008) http://dare.uva.nl/document/121455

Ancient Roman festivals
December observances